Triple Elvis is a 1963 painting of Elvis Presley by the American artist Andy Warhol. The photographic image of Elvis used by Warhol as a basis for this work, taken from a publicity still from the movie Flaming Star, has become iconic and synonymous with the singer.

A Triple Elvis  was sold for $81.9m (£51.9m) at a Christie's auction in New York in November 2014. 
Another  Triple Elvis (1964,   208.3 x 121.5 cm.),  the first in the Triple Elvis''' series whose price became  known, heralded  a trio of images so close together that they appear to be one. It sold at Christie's on November 19, 1998 for US$1,872,500.

Other versions
Other paintings of the same subject by Warhol show Elvis repeated a number of times, such as in the silkscreen painting Double Elvis, which reproduces the second image, almost as a shadow, owned by the Museum of Modern Art.

A further version of the painting, Double Elvis (Ferus type), was auctioned on May 17, 2018, for US$37 million. Another larger version, Eight Elvises'' is a 1963 silkscreen, was sold in 2008 by Annibale Berlingieri for $100 million to a private buyer. The current owner and location of the painting, which has not been seen publicly since the 1960s, are unknown.

Appropriations of Warhol's Elvis paintings 
Other prominent artists have been inspired by Warhol's paintings of Elvis, such as British YBA artist, Gavin Turk, who appropriated the image and stance of Elvis in the Warhol series to produce his own versions of the work. Examples of Turk's silkscreen works on canvas are Yellow Diamond Elvis, 2005, and Pink Diamond Elvis, 2005.

See also
 Eight Elvises
 List of most expensive paintings
 List of all known Elvis silkscreens by Warhol, their current location, buyers, sellers, as well as prices met, when known

References

1963 paintings
Paintings by Andy Warhol
Cultural depictions of Elvis Presley
20th-century portraits